The following lists events that happened during 1977 in Cape Verde.

Incumbents
President: Aristides Pereira
Prime Minister: Pedro Pires

Events

Sports
CS Mindelense won the Cape Verdean Football Championship

Births
January 31: Vadú (d. 2010), singer
June 15: Rui Monteiro, footballer

References

 
Years of the 20th century in Cape Verde
1970s in Cape Verde
Cape Verde
Cape Verde